Tullahoma Regional Airport , also known as William Northern Field and Soesbe-Martin Field, is a public use airport in Coffee County, Tennessee, United States. It is owned by the City of Tullahoma and located two nautical miles (4 km) northwest of its central business district. This airport is included in the National Plan of Integrated Airport Systems for 2011–2015, which categorized it as a general aviation facility.

Facilities and aircraft 
Tullahoma Regional Airport covers an area of 594 acres (240 ha) at an elevation of 1,084 feet (330 m) above mean sea level. It has three runways: 6/24 is 5,501 by 150 feet (1,677 x 46 m) and 18/36 is 5,002 by 100 feet (1,525 x 30 m), both with asphalt/concrete surfaces; 9/27 is 2,693 by 100 feet (821 x 30 m) with a turf surface.

For the 12-month period ending April 8, 2009, the airport had 30,400 aircraft operations, an average of 83 per day: 97% general aviation, 2% air taxi, and 1% military. At that time there were 123 aircraft based at this airport: 84% single-engine, 12% multi-engine, 2% jet, and 2% helicopter.

References

External links 
 Tullahoma Airport at City of Tullahoma website
 Tullahoma Rgn/Northern Fld (THA) at Tennessee DOT airport directory
 Beechcraft Heritage Museum, adjacent to the airport
 Aerial image as of March 1997 from USGS The National Map
 

Airports in Tennessee
Buildings and structures in Coffee County, Tennessee
Transportation in Coffee County, Tennessee